Iron Prince may refer to:

 Iron Prince, South Australia, an iron ore mine connected to a port and steelworks at Whyalla
 , a steamship owned by BHP, built 1909 and wrecked 1923